

B 
 Janet Badjan-Young (1937–), playwright

C 
 William Conton (1925–2003), educator, historian and novelist, also associated with Sierra Leone
 Hassoum Ceesay (1971–), historian, curator, educator, scholar and novelist

D 
 Ebou Dibba (1943–2000), novelist

F 
 Dayo Forster, novelist.

J 
 Hassan Bubacar Jallow (1950–), law books, politician and barrister
 Augusta Jawara (1924–1981), playwright
 Joseph Henry Joof (1960–)
 Alhaji Alieu Ebrima Cham Joof (1924–2011), historian, politician and Pan-Africanist
 Tamsier Joof (1973–)

M 
 Augusta Mahoney (1924–1981), playwright and activist for women's rights

N 
 Sulayman S. Nyang (1944–2018), historian and lecturer

P 
 Lenrie Peters (1932−2009), poet and novelist, also associated with Sierra Leone

S 
 Tijan Sallah (1958–), poet, publisher
 Sally Singhateh (1977–), poet and novelist
 Lamin Sanneh (1942–2019), scholar, novelist, historian, and poet
Modou Lamin Age-Almusaf Sowe (1990–), novelist, scholar, playwright, poet, and event organizer

W 
 Phillis Wheatley (1753–1784), poet

See also
List of Senegalese writers
List of African writers by country

References

External links 
 Gambian literature and writings

 
Writers
Gambia
Gambian